Unfriended is a 2014 screenlife supernatural horror film directed by Levan Gabriadze and produced by Timur Bekmambetov. The first feature film to be entirely set on a computer screen, it is produced in the so-called Screenlife format. The film stars Shelley Hennig, Moses Storm, Renee Olstead, Will Peltz, Jacob Wysocki, and Courtney Halverson as six high school students in a Skype conversation which is haunted by a student, played by Heather Sossaman, who was bullied by them and committed suicide. The film is told almost entirely through a screencast of a MacBook.

The film premiered at the Fantasia Festival on July 20, 2014, and was theatrically released by Universal Pictures in the United States on April 17, 2015. The film received mixed reviews from critics and was a massive box-office success, grossing $62 million against a $1 million budget. A stand-alone sequel, Unfriended: Dark Web, was released in 2018.

Plot
High school student Laura Barns committed suicide by gunshot after an anonymous user uploaded a video of her passing out and defecating at an unsupervised party, and the video went viral. One year later, her former childhood best friend Blaire Lily is chatting with her boyfriend Mitch Roussel on Skype, during which they agree to lose their virginities to each other on prom night. Soon after they are joined by their friends and classmates Jess Felton, Ken Smith, and Adam Sewell, and an unknown user known as "billie227."

The group of friends tries various ways to get rid of the intruder but are unsuccessful each time. Blaire looks up the account and realizes that it belonged to Laura Barns, revealing "billie227" as Laura even though the friends are still incredulous about this possibility. The group suspects that a classmate, Val Rommel, is pranking them. After they invite Val to their chat, Jess' Facebook page is updated with embarrassing photos of Val at a party. Jess denies uploading the photos and deletes them from her account, but the pictures instantly reappear on Adam's account. Val receives a message or picture not visible to the others, but which she considers a threat. Angry, she calls 911 to report that she is being harassed, and abruptly leaves the chat. The group receives a photo of Val and Laura's Facebook messages from before Laura's death, with Val telling Laura to kill herself. Val reappears on the chat, sitting motionless and silent next to a bottle of bleach before collapsing. Police officers arrive shortly after; the friends eavesdrop and learn that Val died from a presumed suicide. Laura then sends each of the friends a personalized message proving intimate knowledge of their secrets; in Blaire's case, which is the one visible to the audience, this turns out to be a couple of pictures revealing that she had an affair with Adam. Ken distributes a program to remove Laura from the chat, and then Adam attempts to call the police. However, the 911 operator turns out to be the intruder and re-enters the chat, revealing a camera view from the other side of Ken's room. He approaches the camera source and his Skype is briefly cut before it shows him killing himself with a blender.

Laura forces the remaining four friends to play a game of Never Have I Ever, stating that the loser will die. During the course of the game, it is revealed that Jess started a rumor that Blaire had an eating disorder; Blaire stole and crashed Jess' mother's car; Mitch made out with Laura (although he says it was one-sided on her end and he pushed her off), and also reported Adam to the police for dealing cannabis; Jess stole $800 from Adam; and Adam offered to trade Jess' life for the others in the group. Tensions flare and a drunken Adam finally loses his temper and uses the game to force Blaire to reveal that she is no longer a virgin, having slept with him behind Mitch's back. Mitch is distraught and retaliates by forcing Adam to admit that he roofied a classmate, raped her while she was unconscious, and then forced her to abort the resulting pregnancy.

Blaire and Adam receive messages sent remotely to their printers which they refuse to show to Mitch and Jess. Mitch threatens to leave if Blaire does not show the note and Laura warns that Mitch will die if he signs off. In a moment of panic, Blaire shows her paper which states: "If you reveal this note, Adam will die." Adam shoots himself, revealing he had the same note, except it was for Blaire.

Laura continues the game, asking Jess if she defaced her grave. When Blaire convinces Jess not to continue playing, Laura cuts the lights in Jess' house and disconnects her video feed. Blaire looks for help on Chatroulette and has a stranger in Nevada send police to Jess‘ house. Soon after, Jess‘ Skype reconnects showing her with an activated curling iron forced down her throat, killing her.

Laura cuts the lights in Blaire's and Mitch's houses, wanting them to confess who uploaded the video. Blaire tells her that Mitch was the one who posted it; Mitch grabs a knife and stabs himself in the eye. Blaire tearfully regrets how their friendship ended, but Laura scoffs at the comment and starts another countdown. Laura then uploads an extended version of the party video to Blaire's Facebook which reveals Blaire as the camera operator for the original video, which quickly gains attention, with multiple people sending hateful comments towards Blaire. Laura says that she wishes she could forgive Blaire before leaving the chat. As Blaire hears her bedroom door creak, Laura, now in the form of her spirit, slams Blaire's laptop shut before attacking her as the screen cuts to black.

Cast

Production
Gabriadze was attracted to the project (then titled Offline) as it focused on the theme of bullying. He noted that the nature of bullying had changed since he was in school, as the Internet allowed for bullies to continue their actions even after school hours.

Production was 16 days total, including six 12-hour days of principal photography, three days of pick-ups and then a few more reshoots. When filming began, it mostly consisted of long takes around ten minutes in length. Shelley Hennig, who portrayed Blaire, found that this proved difficult for the energy and motivation needed from her and the other actors. At her request, at least one full, 80-minute-long take was filmed, with each actor in separate rooms with separate computers. The film's ending was captured during one of these feature-length takes.

The film's title changed during shooting (and would also change prior to its theatrical release), as the film's crew felt that the title of Offline was "too general and not obvious" and that the then title of Cybernatural was "more to the point of what it is". For wide release, the film was re-titled Unfriended.

A deleted scene featured Jess being pulled away, presumably by Laura's spirit. Laura then proceeds to physically abuse Jess by the clicks of a cursor all within Jess's Facebook profile. The scene ends when Laura takes a saw and chops one of Jess's hands off. The scene was later scrapped as it "didn't fit with the horror theme".

Release
Unfriended initially had its world premiere on July 20, 2014, at the Fantasia Festival and screened on the film festival circuit under the title of Cybernatural. A generally positive film festival reception and test screenings for the film prompted Universal Pictures to pick up the film rights with the intent to give it a wide theatrical release the following year. The film's title was changed from Cybernatural to Unfriended and the film was theatrically released on April 17, 2015. The film was screened at Playlist Live on February 6, 2015, and premiered at SXSW on March 13, 2015.

Marketing
Unfriended was heavily marketed online, with 60% of the marketing budget being spent on digital platforms.

In July 2014, a teaser trailer was released with scenes from the film. The teaser shows the original title of the film which at the time was Cybernatural. On January 12, 2015, the film's first official trailer with the title Unfriended was released. Shortly after, on February 6, 2015, the film was screened at Playlist Live, a popular convention for internet celebrities from Vine and YouTube. Images were also released.

On February 13, 2015, a campaign was launched with Kik Messenger, in which Kik users could have a chat conversation with Laura. This made use of automated responses and pre-scripted responses, while also driving users to a dedicated microsite.

On March 13, 2015, after the film's premiere at SXSW, an after-party was hosted by Blumhouse. Exclusive Never Have I Ever cards were released at SXSW later, and a "NEVER HAVE I EVER" section was set up on the film's official website. Unfriended-themed photo booths were set up as well. During production, official Facebook and Skype accounts were set up for the characters in the film, and, after the premiere at SXSW, people who attended were "friended" by the official Laura Barns Facebook account. There was also a Twitter account, which tweeted attendees of the after-party.

Home media and streaming
Unfriended was released on DVD and Blu-ray on August 11, 2015. It received a Netflix release in May 2017.

Reception

Box office
Unfriended grossed $32.5 million in North America and $31.6 million in other territories, for a worldwide gross of $64.1 million against a budget of $1 million. Deadline Hollywood calculated the net profit of the film to be $17.1 million, when factoring together all expenses and revenues.

In North America, the film opened simultaneously with Child 44, Paul Blart: Mall Cop 2 and Monkey Kingdom on April 17, 2015, across 2,739 theaters, earning $6.8 million on its opening day. In its opening weekend, Unfriended earned $15.8 million, which was higher than its $12 million range projection, and finished in third place at the box office behind Furious 7 ($29.2 million) and fellow newcomer Paul Blart: Mall Cop 2 ($23.8 million). Its opening weekend is the biggest debut for an original horror movie since The Conjuring, which opened with $41.9 million in July 2013.

Critical reception
Review aggregator Rotten Tomatoes gives the film an approval rating of 61% based on 186 reviews, with an average rating of 6/10. The site's critical consensus reads, "Unfriended subverts found-footage horror clichés to deliver a surprisingly scary entry in the teen slasher genre with a technological twist." On Metacritic, the film has a weighted average score of 59 out of 100 based on 30 critics, indicating "mixed or average reviews".

Reception at the Fantasia Film Festival was mostly positive. Common praise for the film centered upon its acting and visuals, and Twitch Film commented that the film was an "interesting look at modern methods of communication and the ramifications of the new normal of always-on social interaction." Variety commented that while the film was "exasperating" at points, they also felt that it was clever and innovative.

Dread Central also praised the film overall, but stated that they felt that the movie's one major flaw was "the fashion in which we are trafficked to each scare through multi-screen clicking, copying, pasting and re-sizing, basically all-around multi-tasking. It can be trying to sit through and I liken it to sitting over someone's shoulder watching them web-surf... endlessly." It was named Most Innovative Film at the Fantasia Film Festival and received a Special Mention for Feature Film.

British film critic Mark Kermode gave the film a positive review, calling it a film which understands Skyping culture and cyber-bullying. He said, "Many people who've seen the trailer say, 'You're being stalked through the internet. Just log off.' The point is they can't because they're addicted." While on one hand admitting it was a "shrieky, teen-terrorized, slasher movie," on the other hand he said it was a film about how cyber-bullying only works if you cooperate with it.

Irish film critic Donald Clarke, writing for The Irish Times, gave the film a very positive review, describing it as "genuinely unsettling" and praising the filmmakers' "uncanny grasp of the complicated dynamics of contemporary interaction" and how they succeeded in retaining "a position on the moral high ground while bloody mayhem rages around their feet".

Some critics found the film to contain unintentionally humorous moments that detracted from the experience. Lou Lumenick of the New York Post and Lauren Chval of RedEye found the scenes involving Blaire's pleas for help on Chatroulette, as well as some of the phrases typed by Laura's ghost (including "but in this version [of a drinking game], the loser doesn’t drink. The loser dies."), to be more humorous than frightening.

In CinemaScore polls conducted during the opening weekend, cinema audiences gave Unfriended an average grade of "C", on an A+ to F scale.

Sequel

In April 2015, it was announced that Universal Pictures had greenlit a sequel, tentatively titled Unfriended 2. In October 2017, it was announced that the film was shot secretly and the film’s working title would be Unfriended: Game Night. On March 9, 2018, the film’s official title revealed to be Unfriended: Dark Web. The film was released on July 20, 2018.

See also
 Bullying and suicide
 Cyberbullying
 Chatroom
 The Den
 Friend Request
 List of ghost films
 Take This Lollipop

References

External links

 
 
 
 
 

2010s ghost films
2014 independent films
2010s teen horror films
2014 films
2014 horror films
American ghost films
American independent films
American supernatural horror films
American teen horror films
Blumhouse Productions films
Films about cyberbullying
Films about bullying
American films about revenge
Films about suicide
Films directed by Levan Gabriadze
Films set in California
Films set in 2014
Films shot in Los Angeles County, California
Found footage films
Films about the Internet
Films about social media
Techno-horror films
Unfriended (film series)
Universal Pictures films
Bazelevs Company films
Screenlife films
2010s English-language films
2010s American films